The Mine with the Iron Door is a 1936 American adventure western film directed by David Howard and starring Richard Arlen, Cecilia Parker and Henry B. Walthall. It is an adaptation of Harold Bell Wright's novel of the same title which had previously been turned into a 1924 silent The Mine with the Iron Door.

The film's sets were designed by the art directors Ben Carré and Lewis J. Rachmil.

Cast
 Richard Arlen as Bob Harvey  
 Cecilia Parker as Marta Hill  
 Henry B. Walthall as David Burton 
 Stanley Fields as Dempsey 
 Spencer Charters as Thad Hill  
 Charles C. Wilson as Pitkins 
 Barbara Bedford as Secretary  
 Horace Murphy as Garage Man  
 Buck the Dog as Buck  
 Lester Dorr as Minor Role  
 Earl Gibbs as Indian

References

Bibliography
 Goble, Alan. The Complete Index to Literary Sources in Film. Walter de Gruyter, 1999.

External links
 

1936 films
1936 adventure films
American adventure films
Films directed by David Howard
Films based on American novels
Columbia Pictures films
Remakes of American films
Sound film remakes of silent films
Treasure hunt films
American black-and-white films
1930s English-language films
1930s American films